The Hole is a 2009 American 3D dark fantasy horror film directed by Joe Dante and starring Chris Massoglia, Haley Bennett, Nathan Gamble, Bruce Dern, and Teri Polo. The film follows Dane and Lucas Thompson, two brothers who move into their new house in Bensenville with their single mother, Susan. While settling in their new home, Dane and Lucas, along with their new neighbor, Julie Campbell, discover a trap door in the basement, leading to a bottomless pit and, upon opening it, accidentally unleash a supernatural force that manifests itself into any fear of the person who looks into the hole.

Plot

Seventeen-year-old Dane Thompson, his 10-year-old brother, Lucas, and their mother, Susan, move from Brooklyn to the quiet town of Bensenville where Dane and Lucas befriend their next door neighbor, Julie Campbell. While exploring their new home, Dane and Lucas discover a trapdoor with several locks along each side in the basement. Opening the trapdoor reveals a hole which appears to be bottomless.

Over the next few days, each child experiences strange events. Lucas, having a fear of clowns, discovers a jester puppet on his bed, as well as other locations, as if it is following him. Julie begins to see an injured girl who bleeds from her eyes. Dane starts to see shadowy figures of a large man. Eventually, all three witness the injured girl together at the boys' home where they follow her to the basement and watch as she crawls into the hole.

Julie suggests they seek help from the previous owner of the house, Creepy Carl, who now lives in an abandoned glove factory surrounded by hundreds of lights and lamps. When the kids tell him that they have opened the hole, he berates them for releasing the evil inside stating that it will come for them and kill Dane. Later that night, Carl is seen scribbling in a sketchbook, almost blacking out entire pages. Carl screams, "I'm not done yet!" as the light bulbs around him pop.

The sketchbook turns out to belong to Dane, who returns to the factory to retrieve it. He finds his sketchbook in the darkness; Creepy Carl is gone. Julie decides to get the group relaxed and invites them to swim in her pool. While under the water, Dane sees a shadowy figure of a giant man standing above. Once out of the pool, he notices a trail of muddy footprints which he and Julie follow, leaving Lucas alone in the pool. They hear Julie's pet dog, Charlie, barking and return to see Lucas drowning. Lucas tells them that the jester puppet had pulled him under.

Later that night, while Lucas is asleep, Dane sees a hand-shaped bruise on Lucas's leg. He discovers that it is identical to a hand that Creepy Carl had drawn in the sketchbook. As he flips through the sketchbook, he realizes that each page is a puzzle piece. While working on the puzzle, Dane hears someone whistling. When he walks into the kitchen, he sees an envelope addressed to him from the New Jersey State Penitentiary. A note inside reads 'HELLO BOY'. He rushes upstairs to Lucas and tells him that someone is in the house. While Dane investigates, Lucas meets a police officer standing at the bottom of the stairs. The officer shows Lucas a picture of two little girls and asks if he has seen one of them and points to the girl whom Julie first encountered. The police officer leaves the picture with Lucas and turns to leave revealing the back of his head is missing. Lucas fetches Dane and the pair watch the cop return to the basement and climb into the hole.

Next door, the girl then appears in Julie's room. Julie climbs out of her window and meets the boys where she reveals to Dane that she and her best friend, Annie Smith, were playing on the tracks of an old roller coaster which resulted in an accident where Annie fell to her death. In an attempt to help Julie, a police officer also ended up falling to his death. She decides to return to the amusement park where the accident occurred; Dane goes after her, leaving Lucas on his own.

Julie finds her friend sitting on the same spot from which she fell. After Julie helps Annie understand that she had tried to save her, Annie disappears and is pleased that Julie is no longer scared. Meanwhile, Lucas hears Dane calling him to the basement. Confused, he follows the voice to discover the jester puppet mimicking Dane's voice. The puppet attacks Lucas, but is outwitted and eventually destroyed. Dane and Julie return and Lucas announces that he is no longer afraid of clowns. Dane then tells them of a theory that once you look into the hole, it somehow knows you and creates whatever you are afraid of. When asked what he is afraid of, Dane replies that he is not afraid of anything.

Julie then invites Dane and Lucas to stay at her place for the night. As Lucas is gathering his things, Dane shows Julie the puzzle he had been working on. They solve the puzzle together and see a boy being grabbed by a giant man. Dane rushes upstairs to find that Lucas is gone. Dane finally reveals that he is afraid of his father, who had abused the entire family and is now in prison. Realizing that his father has taken Lucas into the hole, Dane jumps into the hole as well.

Dane finds Lucas hiding in the closet of a twisted version of their old home. Their father, who has become a giant, discovers them and starts to break through the door. They turn around and discover the shelving seems to be a ladder. Dane tells Lucas to start climbing. Dane starts to follow, until his father drags him back down. As Dane fights him off, the giant father slowly returns to his actual size as Dane starts to confront his fear, seeing him for what he really is. Their surroundings begin to crumble and the floor falls away leaving Dane and his father trapped on an island under a ceiling fan. Having taken his father's belt, Dane pulls himself onto the fan and gives the crumbling floor one final blow with the belt buckle causing the floor to break apart and the father to fall.

Dane emerges from the hole where Julie and Lucas are waiting. They close the hole, just as their mother comes down to the basement. She sees the trapdoor and opens it, revealing a shallow crawl space below. As the group heads upstairs, Lucas asks his mom if she is afraid of anything. She replies that she was afraid of a monster under her bed when she was a little girl. Lucas says, "Uh oh," as the trapdoor blows open again revealing the darkness has returned.

In the post-credits, the jester puppet is shown winking his left eye.

Cast

Production
The film began shooting in 3D on December 5, 2008, in Vancouver, Canada.

Release
The Hole had its world premiere at the 66th Venice International Film Festival on September 11, 2009. It was screened at the 2009 Toronto International Film Festival the following day, and later at the 2010 Cannes Film Festival.

The film was first released theatrically in Thailand on May 5, 2010. It had its United States debut screening at the Castro Theatre in San Francisco on October 7, 2011. The Hole was released in 3D in select theatres in Los Angeles and Atlanta on September 28, 2012, and was made available on DVD, Blu-ray, and video on demand (VOD) on October 2, 2012.

Reception
The film garnered positive reviews from critics. Film review aggregator Rotten Tomatoes reports that 81% of critics gave the film a positive review, based on 36 reviews, with a rating average of 6.4 out of 10. The site's consensus reads, "A welcome throwback to the suburban teen thrillers of the 1980s, The Hole is a scary, enjoyable return to form for director Joe Dante."

References

External links
 
 
 Interview with director Joe Dante

2009 films
2009 horror films
2009 independent films
2009 3D films
2000s horror thriller films
2000s teen fantasy films
2000s teen horror films
American 3D films
American horror thriller films
American independent films
American teen horror films
Bold Films films
American dark fantasy films
American fantasy thriller films
Fictional dolls and dummies
Films directed by Joe Dante
Films scored by Javier Navarrete
Films shot in Vancouver
Teen thriller films
2000s English-language films
2000s American films